Ezequiel Calvente Criado (born 12 January 1991), known simply as Ezequiel, is a Spanish professional footballer who plays as a left winger for Arenas CD.

Club career
Ezequiel was born in Melilla. After playing in every youth rank at Real Betis, he made his first-team debut as a second-half substitute in a 4–1 home win against Granada CF in the Segunda División. Three days later, he started in a 2–1 home victory over UD Salamanca in the second round of the Copa del Rey, and signed a professional contract the following day until July 2014.

On 29 January 2012, Ezequiel was loaned to CE Sabadell FC of the second division until June. In late July, after an unsuccessful trial with Borussia Mönchengladbach, he moved, still on loan, to another club in Germany and the Bundesliga, SC Freiburg, which had the option of signing him permanently at the end of the campaign. After only two substitute appearances, and five for the reserves, he spent the next season on loan at division two side Recreativo de Huelva.

In January 2015, after months as a free agent, Ezequiel signed for F.C. Penafiel. After roughly 300 minutes of action and relegation from the Primeira Liga, he switched countries again in August when he joined Hungary's Békéscsaba 1912 Előre. On 5 July 2016, he was loaned to Szombathelyi Haladás also in the Nemzeti Bajnokság I after his team's descent.

International career
On 24 July 2010, whilst representing Spain's under-19 at the 2010 UEFA European Championship, Ezequiel scored from a penalty kick against Italy in the group stage. It was described by British newspaper The Guardian as being "on an altogether higher plane of spot-kick audacity", as the player kicked it with what looked to be his standing leg, fooling the goalkeeper into going the other way; the national side eventually finished in second position in France.

References

External links

1991 births
Living people
Spanish footballers
Footballers from Melilla
Association football wingers
La Liga players
Segunda División players
Segunda División B players
Tercera División players
Tercera Federación players
Divisiones Regionales de Fútbol players
Betis Deportivo Balompié footballers
Real Betis players
CE Sabadell FC footballers
Recreativo de Huelva players
AD Ceuta FC players
CD Eldense footballers
Real Jaén footballers
Bundesliga players
SC Freiburg players
Primeira Liga players
F.C. Penafiel players
Nemzeti Bajnokság I players
Békéscsaba 1912 Előre footballers
Szombathelyi Haladás footballers
Debreceni VSC players
Spain youth international footballers
Spanish expatriate footballers
Expatriate footballers in Germany
Expatriate footballers in Portugal
Expatriate footballers in Hungary
Spanish expatriate sportspeople in Germany
Spanish expatriate sportspeople in Portugal
Spanish expatriate sportspeople in Hungary